Robert McEwen may refer to:

Bob McEwen (Robert D. McEwen, born 1950),  U.S. Representative from Ohio (1981–1993)
Robert C. McEwen (1920–1997), U.S. Representative from New York (1965–1981)
Robbie McEwen (born 1972), Australian-Belgian bicyclist
Rob McEwen (born 1950), Canadian businessman
Rob McEwen (footballer) (1926–1993), Australian rules footballer

See also 
Bob McEwan (1881–1957), Scottish footballer